Alperen Duymaz (born 3 November 1992) is a Turkish actor and model.

Life and career
Duymaz was interested in music and modeling during his high school years. He later graduated from Hacettepe University Ankara State Conservatory Theater Department. Duymaz made his television debut with a role in "Tatlı Küçük Yalancılar" which adaptation of Pretty Little Liars. He continued his career with subsequent roles in Acı Aşk and youth series Bodrum Masalı. In 2018, he made his cinematic debut and portrayed the character of Kutay in the historical movie Direniş Karatay. In the same year, he had a recurring role in the crime series Çukur as Emrah. In late 2018 and later in 2019, he was among the main cast of crime series Çarpışma and portrayed Kerem Korkmaz. Since early 2020, he has been starring on Show TV's series Zemheri as Ayaz.In 2021 , he started acting in "Son Yaz" as Akgun.

Filmography

References 

1992 births
Turkish male television actors
Turkish male models
Hacettepe University Ankara State Conservatory alumni
Living people